KNKX (88.5 MHz) is a public radio station licensed to Tacoma, Washington, United States. A member of National Public Radio (NPR), it airs a jazz and news format for the Seattle metropolitan area. The station is owned by Pacific Public Media, a community-based non-profit organization. It operates from studios in downtown Seattle and downtown Tacoma. KNKX broadcasts from West Tiger Mountain in the Issaquah Alps with a power of 68,000 watts.

The station originally debuted in 1966 as KPLU-FM, owned by Parkland-based Pacific Lutheran University (PLU). It became a community licensee in 2016 after a proposed sale to the University of Washington, owner of fellow NPR station KUOW-FM in Seattle, resulted in opposition from station listeners.

KNKX runs jazz programs middays, evenings and overnight, and carries a variety of NPR programs in other dayparts, including All Things Considered, Morning Edition, Wait Wait... Don't Tell Me! and Fresh Air. The locally produced BirdNote airs every morning.

History
KNKX was the brainchild of Chris Knudzen, a regent of PLU from Burlington who, in 1951, donated the then-under construction Eastvold Chapel (now the Karen Hille Phillips Center for the Performing Arts) with a radio studio to the university under the desire of having it host a radio station. While the studio was used extensively, it took 15 years for the station to debut; the station formally signed on the air as KPLU-FM on November 16, 1966, with the inaugural broadcast featuring a short speech from President Robert Mortvedt and interviews with local community leaders. It was primarily run by university students and played jazz, blues and other music not usually heard on commercial radio stations. Originally, it broadcast from a tower on campus that was only 140 feet tall, effectively limiting its coverage area to Tacoma and adjacent suburbs. Over time, the station added news programs from NPR to its schedule. It improved its coverage area, both by increasing its power and relocating to a tower that is  Height Above Average Terrain, allowing it to challenge established NPR member KUOW. For listeners outside the Tacoma-Seattle area, it set up eleven translators and simulcast stations.

On November 12, 2015, Pacific Lutheran University announced its intention to sell the station to the University of Washington, owner of KUOW. The planned sale to UW triggered public outcry from KPLU's listener base, who feared KPLU's unique programming would be sacrificed if it became a sister station to KUOW. On November 23, the KPLU advisory board voted unanimously to oppose the sale. The board sought to negotiate with a community-based non-profit group, Friends of 88.5, to raise $7,000,000 to buy the radio station and its network of translators and rebroadcasters from the university, keeping it independent. By May 26, 2016, some 20,000 supporters met the goal. Friends of 88.5 began negotiating with PLU to purchase the station.

On August 12, 2016, it was announced that the station would adopt the new call letters KNKX, pronounced like "Connects", which was chosen among several other choices by the station's listening audience. The new call sign went into effect when the station officially changed hands from PLU to Friends of 88.5 on August 30, 2016; the change was made as the station could not keep the KPLU callsign (as it was university property) during the sale negotiations. In October 2018, it was announced that KNKX would move their Tacoma studio to downtown Tacoma, at 930 Broadway. On August 29, 2019, the first live broadcast from their new home was aired by Dick Stein. The station hosted a grand opening celebration on September 7, 2019. KNKX subsequently announced its plan to relocate its Seattle studio to the Madore Building, part of Pike Place Market, in March 2022.

Translators
KNKX is also carried on the following satellite and broadcast translator stations to improve reception of the station:

The West Seattle translator serves portions of Seattle that are shielded by hilly terrain from the main KNKX signal.

See also
 List of jazz radio stations in the United States

References

External links

NKX
NPR member stations
Jazz radio stations in the United States
Radio stations established in 1966
1966 establishments in Washington (state)